Nora Samosir is a Singaporean actress of Indonesian descent who won a 2002 Life Theatre Award for Best Supporting Actress. She has been active in the Singapore theatre scene since 1979 and has worked in television and film. Some of her more notable performances include The Swallowed Seed (2002) and Revelations (2003)

Background
Samosir is of Indonesian descent and speaks English, Malay and Indonesian fluently. Her professional training is in acting and voice production, which she also teaches at the National University of Singapore. She studied at the Central School of Speech and Drama, London, and graduated from York University, Toronto, Canada with a Bachelor of Arts (Honours), and has multiple qualifications in vocal training and voice studies. She is a member of the Association of Singapore Actors, the Singapore Drama Educators Association, and currently a lecturer in the Department of English Language and Literature at the National University of Singapore, where she lectures in Theatre Studies and teaches voice production, teaching 'Introduction to Theatre and Drama', 'Praxis in Theatre and Performance Theory', and 'Voice Studies and Production'.

Career
Samosir has done extensive work in Singapore with such groups as Singapore Repertory Theatre (SRT), Action Theatre, The Necessary Stage (TNS), Cake Theatre, Black Tent Theater, Music and Movement, and TheatreWorks (TW), as well as performing at venues such as National Museum of Singapore, Dublin Fringe Festival, National Theatre Festival (at the National School of Drama in Delhi), Asian Theatre Festival at Kyungsung University in Busan, Lyric Theatre, Festival of Perth, TheatreWorks Retrospective Festival, Kuala Lumpur, Adelaide Festival of Arts, and National Institute of Education.

Selected notable theatre appearances
Asian Boys Volume 1 (2000) with The Necessary Stage
Destinies of Flowers in the Mirror (2009) 
Temple (2008) with Cake Theatre
120 (2007) with the National Museum of Singapore
Doubt (2006)
Queen Ping (2006) with Cake Theatre
The Vagina Monologues (2004) with The Arts House
Revelations (2003) with TNS
Pulse Version Theatre (2003) with TheatreWorks
Proof (2002) with Action Theatre
Fruit Plays (2002)
Human Heart Fruit by Stella Konand
The Swallowed Seed by Jean Tay

Filmography
Singapore Shorts Vol. 2 (Asian Film Archive's) (2008)
Imelda Goes to Singapore (2008)
Shanghai Lily (1999)
Passionflower (1986)

Partial television
Masters of the Sea (1994)
Shiver (1997)
Ah Girl (2001–2002)
Guru Paarvai (2004)
Stories of Love (2008)

Criticism and praise
In considering her role in Doubt (2006), Richard Lord of Quarterly Literary Review Singapore wrote that her portrayal of Sister Aloysius was unsympathetic and led to the audience believing in the innocence of Father Brendan as played by Lim Yu Beng.  When speaking of her award-winning role of Claire in Proof (2002), Daniel Teo of Inkpot Reviews praised her performance and her precision, while Richard Lord of QLRS felt she exaggerated her character, but had shown better work in performance earlier that year."  The following year in his review of Revelations (2003), Lord gave a mixed review of the production's "faulty structure", yet approved of Samosir's performance.  In 2003, Samosir was involved with Pulse (2003), an experimental series of 3 interlinked plays loosely based on an urban woman's diary. The series was reviewed by Matthew Lyon of Inkpot Reviews, who felt her performance in the second of the three was "the strongest of the whole series."

Awards
2002 Life Theatre Award for Best Supporting Actress for her role of Claire in Action Theatre's 2002 production of "Proof".

Further reading
The lady of soul and her ultimate "S" machine, by Tarn How Tan
PIE to SPOILT: a collection of plays, by Tze Chien Chong 
A history of amnesia: poems, by Alfian Sa'at 
Private parts and other playthings, by Michael Chiang

References

Singaporean actresses
Living people
Indonesian emigrants to Singapore
People of Batak descent
Year of birth missing (living people)